Toni Walker (born February 17, 1952) is an American politician who has served in the Connecticut House of Representatives from the 93rd district since 2001.

References

1952 births
Living people
Women state legislators in Connecticut
Democratic Party members of the Connecticut House of Representatives
21st-century American politicians
21st-century American women politicians